Hiram na Alaala is a 2014 Philippine television drama romantic series broadcast by GMA Network. It premiered on the network's Telebabad line up from September 22, 2014 to January 9, 2015, replacing Ang Dalawang Mrs. Real.

Mega Manila ratings are provided by AGB Nielsen Philippines.

Series overview

Episodes

September 2014

October 2014

November 2014

December 2014

January 2015

References

Lists of Philippine drama television series episodes